The 20th BRDC International Trophy was a non-championship Formula One race held at Silverstone on 25 April 1968.

Report

Entry
A total of 15 F1 cars were entered for the event, with Tony Lanfranchi due to make his F1 debut.

Qualifying
Denny Hulme took pole position for Bruce McLaren Motor Racing team, in their McLaren-Cosworth M7A, averaging a speed of 127.635 mph, around the 2.927 mile course. He was joined on the front row by Mike Spence with his BRM P126.

Race
The race was held over 52 laps of the Silverstone circuit. Denny Hulme took the winner spoils for works McLaren team, driving their McLaren-Cosworth M7A. Hulme won in a time of 1hr 14:44.8mins., averaging a speed of 124.744 mph. Around 10.9 seconds behind was the second place car, that of his team-mate and team owner, Bruce McLaren. The podium was completed by another Kiwi, Chris Amon, giving New Zealand a podium lock-out. Amon was 5.6 seconds adrift off McLaren in his Ferrari 312. With the second Ferrari in fourth, driven by Jacky Ickx, the first English driver home was Piers Courage in his privately entered BRM P126, albeit one lap down.

Classification

References

BRDC International Trophy
BRDC International Trophy
BRDC International Trophy
BRDC International Trophy
BRDC International Trophy